The 2011 Big Ten Football Championship Game was a college football game.  It was played on December 3, 2011, at Lucas Oil Stadium in Indianapolis, Indiana, to determine the 2011 champion of the Big Ten Conference. The Wisconsin Badgers of the Leaders Division beat the Michigan State Spartans of the Legends Division by a score of 42–39.  By winning the game, Wisconsin earned a berth in the 2012 Rose Bowl.

The game was the first football championship game ever played in the Big Ten's 115-year history. The game was played in prime time and televised by Fox.

Scoring summary

References

Championship
2011
Michigan State Spartans football games
Wisconsin Badgers football games
December 2011 sports events in the United States
2011 in sports in Indiana
2010s in Indianapolis